La Ferrière is a commune in the Vendée department in the Pays de la Loire region in western France.

Geography
The river Yon forms all of the commune's north-western and western borders.

Population

See also
Communes of the Vendée department

References

Communes of Vendée